The Unicorn Series is a young-adult fantasy novel series by Tanith Lee. The trilogy revolves around Tanaquil, a young woman who is better at tinkering than magic, much to the dismay of her sorceress mother.

Black Unicorn 

Black Unicorn (1991) is the first novel of The Unicorn Series.

Plot summary 
It was big and beautiful and so black that it was like a hole in space, and it was completely impossible. Unicorns didn't belong in this world except in legends. But there it stood, radiating magical power, in the shattered wreck of the party.

Nobody knew where it had come from, or what it wanted. Not even Jaive, the sorceress, could fathom the mystery of the fabled beast. But Tanaquil, Jaive's completely unmagical daughter, understood it at once. She knew why the unicorn was there: It had come for her. It needed her.

Yet she was the girl with no talent for magic. She could only fiddle with broken bits of machinery and make them work again. What could she do for a unicorn?

This unicorn, which once was of radiant mother of pearl hue, became of this world through majestic being and wondrous magnificence.

Gold Unicorn 

Gold Unicorn (1994) is the second novel of The Unicorn Series.

Plot summary 
After traveling the world, young sorceress Tanaquil begins her return home. On the way she discovers a vast army led by an empress - Lizra, Tanaquil's half-sister.

Tanaquil's magical power of mending is exactly what Lizra needs. Lizra makes Tanaquil use her talent on her giant mechanical gold unicorn, which Tanaquil learns is a war-machine that her sister is planning on using to perfect a world she sees as flawed. Tanaquil is repelled by Lizra's acts of destruction, but her attraction to Lizra's betrothed, a young man named Honj, keeps her from leaving, so she follows the unicorn, even when it leads into a terrifying alternate world.

Red Unicorn 

Red Unicorn (1997) is the third and final novel of The Unicorn Series.

Plot summary 
Tanaquil finally returns to her mother's fortress in the desert, but only disappointment and heart-ache await her. As she contemplates leaving once again when a red unicorn appears, and she follows it into a mirror where she finds a world that exact opposite of her own, complete with a version of herself named Tanakil. As Tanaquil grapples with her twin, she faces not only the darkness of this new world, but the darkness within herself.

Characters 
 Tanaquil- The young daughter of a powerful sorceress. Though born to a witch mother, Tanaquil has no skills for spells and such, she instead, is a 'mender' who can fix anything and it will never break again.
 Jaive- Tanaquil's sorceress mother.
The Peeve- Tanaquil's familiar, a desert creature similar to a mongoose or a weasel who can speak thanks to Jaive's magic.
Lizra- A beautiful princess and Tanaquil's half-sister.
Honj- Lizra's betrothed and Tanaquil's love interest in the story.

External links 
 The Black Unicorn at FantasticFiction.co.uk
 Tanith Lee Bibliography
 Fantastic Fiction: Gold Unicorn
 Internet Book List: Unicorn Trilogy

Series by Tanith Lee
Fantasy novel series